Chief Elizabeth Abimbola Awoliyi,  (née  Akerele, 1910–14 September 1971) was the first woman to practise as a physician in Nigeria. She was also the first West African woman to earn a license of Royal Surgeon in Dublin. In 1938, Elizabeth Awoliyi became the second West African woman to qualify as an orthodox-medicine trained physician after Agnes Yewande Savage who graduated from medical school in 1929. She was the second president of the National Council of Women's Societies of Nigeria from 1964 until her death in 1971.

Life
Elizabeth Abimbola Awoliyi was born in Lagos, South-western part of  Nigeria, to the Aguda family of David Evaristo and Rufina Akerele.  She commenced her education at St. Mary's Catholic School, Lagos from where she proceeded to Queen's College, Lagos. Elizabeth Abimbola Awoliyi earned her medical degree in 1938 from the University of Dublin, Cafreys College. She graduated from Dublin with first class honors, including a medal in Medicine and distinction in Anatomy. She became the first West African woman to be awarded a licentiate of Royal Surgeon in Dublin. She was a member of the Royal College of Physicians (United Kingdom) and the Royal College of Obstetricians and Gynaecology and a Diplomate of the Royal College of Paediatrics and Child Health.

Elizabeth Abimbola Awoliyi returned to Nigeria and became a gynaecologist and junior medical officer at the Massey Street Hospital Lagos. She later became a chief consultant and Medical Director at that hospital, holding the latter position from 1960 through 1969.  In 1962, she was appointed as a senior specialist gynaecologist and obstetrician by the Federal Ministry of Health.

Some of her awards are: Member of the Most Excellent Order of the British Empire (MBE), Iya Abiye of Lagos, Iyalaje of Oyo Empire, and Nigerian National Honor – Officer of the Order of the Federal Republic (OFR).

The novel Return to Life, by her son Tunji Awoliyi, is dedicated to her.

Elizabeth Abimbola Awoliyi is mentioned in "Chapter Six: Nigerian Heroines of the 20th Century" in the book Nigerian heroes and heroines: and other issues in citizenship education, by Godwin Chukwuemeka Ezeh.

Dr. Abimbola Awoliyi Memorial Hospital is located in Lagos Island, Lagos, Nigeria.

Elizabeth Awoliyi dabbled in private enterprise – owning a 27-acre poultry and orange farm in Agege, Lagos and becoming director of the commercial medical store in Lagos.

NCWS
Elizabeth Abimbola Awoliyi was the pioneer president of the Lagos branch of the National Council of Women's Societies (NCWS) and a member of the national committee of the organization. As a member, she contributed to various policies and activities of the women's organization. She negotiated for the gift of a national headquarters located at Tafawa Balewa Square and was a consultant to the organization's family planning clinic which later became the planned parenthood federation of Nigeria. She succeeded Kofo Ademola as the second president of the NCWS in 1964.

Leadership and philanthropy 
 Holy Cross Cathedral Lagos, where she became the first president of the Holy Cross Parish Women Council.
 Motherless babies Home Governing Council
 Business and Professional Women's Association (president)
 Child Care Voluntary Association (President)
 Lagos Colony Red Cross
 National Council of Women's Society (Also became the first President of the Lagos branch)

Personal life 
Elizabeth Abimbola Awoliyi was married to physician Dr. S. O. Awoliyi and had two children; a son and a daughter. Her husband died in 1965. Dr Elizabeth Abimbola Awoliyi died on 14 September 1971 at the age of 61.

Awards and honours 
 Member of the Order of the British Empire (MBE)
 Iya Abiye of Lagos
 Iyalaje of Oyo
 Nigerian National Honor – Officer of the Order of the Federal Republic (OFR)

See also
 Timeline of women in science
 Women in medicine

References

Sources

1910 births
1971 deaths
Nigerian gynaecologists
Women gynaecologists
Nigerian women medical doctors
20th-century Nigerian medical doctors
Physicians from Lagos
Yoruba women physicians
Alumni of Trinity College Dublin
Queen's College, Lagos alumni
People from colonial Nigeria
Members of the Order of the British Empire
Officers of the Order of the Niger
History of women in Lagos
20th-century Nigerian women
20th-century women physicians